A goitre, or goiter, is a swelling in the neck resulting from an enlarged thyroid gland. A goitre can be associated with a thyroid that is not functioning properly.

Worldwide, over 90% of goitre cases are caused by iodine deficiency. The term is from the Latin gutturia, meaning throat. Most goitres are not cancerous (benign), though they may be potentially harmful.

Signs and symptoms
A goitre can present as a palpable or visible enlargement of the thyroid gland at the base of the neck. A goitre, if associated with hypothyroidism or hyperthyroidism, may be present with symptoms of the underlying disorder. For hyperthyroidism, the most common symptoms are associated with adrenergic stimulation: tachycardia (increased heart rate), palpitations, nervousness, tremor, increased blood pressure and heat intolerance. Clinical manifestations are often related to hypermetabolism (increased metabolism), excessive thyroid hormone, an increase in oxygen consumption, metabolic changes in protein metabolism, immunologic stimulation of diffuse goitre, and ocular changes (exophthalmos). Hypothyroid people commonly have poor appetite, cold intolerance, constipation, lethargy and may undergo weight gain. However, these symptoms are often non-specific and make diagnosis difficult.

According to the WHO classification of goitre by palpation, the severity of goitre is currently graded as grade 0, grade 1, grade 2.

Causes
Worldwide, the most common cause for goitre is iodine deficiency, commonly seen in countries that scarcely use iodized salt. Selenium deficiency is also considered a contributing factor. In countries that use iodized salt, Hashimoto's thyroiditis is the most common cause.  Goitre can also result from cyanide poisoning, which is particularly common in tropical countries where people eat the cyanide-rich cassava root as the staple food.

 Sarcoidosis
 Amyloidosis
 Hydatidiform mole
 Cysts
 Acromegaly
 Pendred syndrome

Diagnosis

Goitre may be diagnosed via a thyroid function test in an individual suspected of having it.

Types
A goitre may be classified either as nodular or diffuse. Nodular goitres are either of one nodule (uninodular) or of multiple nodules (multinodular). Multinodular goiter (MNG) is the most common disorder of the thyroid gland.

Growth pattern
 Uninodular goitre: one thyroid nodule; can be either inactive, or active (toxic) – autonomously producing thyroid hormone.
 Multinodular goitre: multiple nodules; can likewise be inactive or toxic, the latter is called toxic multinodular goitre and associated with hyperthyroidism. These nodules grow up at varying rates and secrete thyroid hormone autonomously, thereby suppressing TSH-dependent growth and function in the rest of gland. Inactive nodules in the same goitre can be malignant. Thyroid cancer is identified in 13.7% of the patients operated for multinodular goitre.
 Diffuse goitre: the whole thyroid appearing to be enlarged due to hyperplasia.

Size
 Class I: the goitre in normal posture of the head cannot be seen; it is only found by palpation.
 Class II: the goitre is palpable and can be easily seen.
 Class III: the goitre is very large and is retrosternal (partially or totally lying below the sternum), pressure results in compression marks.

Treatment
Goitre is treated according to the cause. If the thyroid gland is producing an excess of thyroid hormones (T3 and T4), radioactive iodine is given to the patient to shrink the gland. If goitre is caused by iodine deficiency, small doses of iodide in the form of Lugol's iodine or KI solution are given. If the goitre is associated with an underactive thyroid, thyroid supplements are used as treatment. Sometimes a partial or complete thyroidectomy is required.

Epidemiology

Goitre is more common among women, but this includes the many types of goitre caused by autoimmune problems, and not only those caused by simple lack of iodine.

History

Chinese physicians of the Tang Dynasty (618–907) were the first to successfully treat patients with goitre by using the iodine-rich thyroid gland of animals such as sheep and pigs—in raw, pill, or powdered form. This was outlined in Zhen Quan's (d. 643 AD) book, as well as several others. One Chinese book, The Pharmacopoeia of the Heavenly Husbandman, asserted that iodine-rich sargassum was used to treat goitre patients by the 1st century BC, but this book was written much later.

In the 12th century, Zayn al-Din al-Jurjani, a Persian physician, provided the first description of Graves' disease after noting the association of goitre and a displacement of the eye known as exophthalmos in his Thesaurus of the Shah of Khwarazm, the major medical dictionary of its time. The disease was later named after Irish doctor Robert James Graves, who described a case of goitre with exophthalmos in 1835. The German Karl Adolph von Basedow also independently reported the same constellation of symptoms in 1840, while earlier reports of the disease were also published by the Italians Giuseppe Flajani and Antonio Giuseppe Testa, in 1802 and 1810 respectively, and by the English physician Caleb Hillier Parry (a friend of Edward Jenner) in the late 18th century.

Paracelsus (1493–1541) was the first person to propose a relationship between goitre and minerals (particularly lead) in drinking water. Iodine was later discovered by Bernard Courtois in 1811 from seaweed ash.

Goitre was previously common in many areas that were deficient in iodine in the soil. For example, in the English Midlands, the condition was known as Derbyshire Neck. In the United States, goitre was found in the Appalachian, Great Lakes, Midwest, and Intermountain regions. The condition is now practically absent in affluent nations, where table salt is supplemented with iodine. However, it is still prevalent in India, China, Central Asia, and Central Africa.

Goitre had been prevalent in the alpine countries for a long time. Switzerland reduced the condition by introducing iodised salt in 1922. The Bavarian tracht in  the Miesbach and Salzburg regions, which appeared in the 19th century, includes a choker, dubbed Kropfband (struma band) which was used to hide either the goitre or the remnants of goitre surgery.

Society and culture
In the 1920s wearing bottles of iodine around the neck was believed to prevent goitre.

Notable cases
 Former U.S. President George H. W. Bush and his wife Barbara Bush were both diagnosed with Graves' disease and goitres, within two years of each other. The disease caused hyperthyroidism and cardiac dysrhythmia.  Scientists said that, absent an environmental cause, the odds of both a husband and wife having Graves' disease might be 1 in 100,000 or as low as 1 in 3,000,000.

Heraldry
The coat of arms and crest of Die Kröpfner, of Tyrol showed a man "afflicted with a large goitre", an apparent pun on the German for the word ("Kropf").

See also 
 David Marine conducted substantial research on the treatment of goitre with iodine.
 Endemic goitre
 Struma ovarii—a kind of teratoma
 Thyroid hormone receptor

References

External links 

Endocrine diseases
Thyroid
Thyroid disease